Cryptandra debilis is a species of flowering plant in the family Rhamnaceae and is endemic to north Queensland. It is a small shrub with clustered, linear leaves and densely-hairy, white, tube-shaped flowers.

Description
The upper surface of the leaves is glabrous and the edges are rolled under, obscuring the lower surface. The flowers are white and borne singly in leaf axils in groups of up to four with 3 to 6 bracts at the base.

Taxonomy and naming
Cryptandra debilis was first formally described in 2004 by Anthony Bean in the journal Austrobaileya from specimens collected near Watsonville in 1997. The specific epithet (debilis) means "weak" or "feeble", referring to the stature of the plant.

Distribution and habitat
This cryptandra grows in shrubland on sandstone and granite ridges on parts of the Atherton Tableland and nearby Mount Mulligan in far north Queensland.

References

debilis
Rosales of Australia
Flora of Queensland
Plants described in 2004
Taxa named by Anthony Bean